The Fischingertal is a 5 kilometer long valley running between Mumpf and Schupfart in the Rheinfelden District of Canton Aargau, Switzerland.

Landforms of Aargau
Valleys of Switzerland